Antelope Lake is an endorheic lake in the south-west corner of the Canadian province of Saskatchewan. The lake is in the Prairie Pothole Region of North America, which extends throughout three Canadian provinces and five U.S. states, and within Palliser's Triangle and the Great Plains ecoregion of Canada.

There are no communities along the lake's shore–only a regional park.

Antelope Lake Regional Park 
Antelope Lake Regional Park is located on the western shore of Antelope Lake. The park was founded on 17 October 1972 when Regional Park Board bought the land from Mr and Mrs Earl Hemsworth. The park is bordered by hillsides, has a 9-hole golf course, campground, ball diamond, rental hall, horseshoe pits, volleyball net, man-made swimming pond, two shower houses, and a sandy beach. While the lake is not suitable for fishing, there is a man-made rainbow trout pond in the park.

The golf course is a 2,566-yard, par 34 sand greens course and the campground has 52 campsites.

See also 
List of lakes of Saskatchewan
List of protected areas of Saskatchewan
Tourism in Saskatchewan

References 

Lakes of Saskatchewan
Webb No. 138, Saskatchewan